is a former Nippon Professional Baseball outfielder for the Hiroshima Toyo Carp.

External links

1976 births
Living people
People from Kurume
Japanese baseball players
Nippon Professional Baseball outfielders
Hiroshima Toyo Carp players
Japanese baseball coaches
Nippon Professional Baseball coaches
Baseball people from Fukuoka Prefecture